Fáskrúðsfjarðargöng is a tunnel in Iceland, located in Eastern Region along Route 1 (formerly along Route 96).

References

Road tunnels in Iceland
Tunnels completed in 2005
Buildings and structures in Eastern Region (Iceland)